The 1922 Yale Bulldogs football team was an American football team that represented Yale University as an independent during the 1922 college football season. The Bulldogs finished with a 6–3–1 record under fifth-year head coach Tad Jones.

Schedule

References

Yale
Yale Bulldogs football seasons
Yale Bulldogs football